Palpita griseofascialis is a moth in the family Crambidae. It was described by Inoue in 1997. It is found in Indonesia (Sumatra) and Peninsular Malaysia.

Subspecies
Palpita griseofascialis griseofascialis
Palpita griseofascialis sumatrana Inoue, 1997 (Sumatra)

References

Moths described in 1997
Palpita
Moths of Asia